Eugene Dominic Genovese (May 19, 1930 – September 26, 2012) was an American historian of the American South and American slavery. He was noted for bringing a Marxist perspective to the study of power, class and relations between planters and slaves in the South. His book Roll, Jordan, Roll: The World the Slaves Made won the Bancroft Prize. He later abandoned the left and Marxism and embraced traditionalist conservatism.

He wrote during the Cold War and his political beliefs, at the time, were considered highly controversial.

Early life and education
Genovese was born on May 19, 1930, in Brooklyn, New York. His father was an immigrant dockworker and Eugene was raised in a working-class Italian American family.

In 1945, at the age of 15, he joined the Communist Party USA, and was active in the youth movement until he was expelled in 1950, at the age of 20, for disregarding party discipline or, as he said, "for having zigged when [he] was supposed to zag." He earned his Bachelor of Arts from Brooklyn College in 1953 and his Master of Arts in 1955 and a Ph.D. in history in 1959, both from Columbia University. He taught at another dozen universities, including Yale, Cambridge and Rutgers.

He was later discharged from army service for his communist leanings, and despite these experiences, he remained a Marxist thinker until the 1980s.

Career
Genovese first taught at Brooklyn's Polytechnic Institute from 1958 to 1963. During the early years of the Vietnam War, when there was a growing range of opinions about the war and the Civil Rights Movement, he was a controversial figure as a history professor at Rutgers University (1963–67), and at the University of Rochester (1969–86), where he was elected chairman of the Department of History.

From 1986, Genovese taught part-time at the College of William and Mary, Georgia Institute of Technology, University of Georgia, Emory University and Georgia State University. He was an editor of Studies on the Left and Marxist Perspectives. He was famous for his disputes with colleagues left, right and center. Defeating Oscar Handlin in 1978, he was elected as the first Marxist president of the Organization of American Historians.

In 1998, after moving to the right in his thinking, Genovese founded The Historical Society, with the goal of bringing together historians united by a traditional methodology.

Controversy during the Vietnam war 
At an April 23, 1965, teach-in at Rutgers University where he was teaching, Genovese stated, "Those of you who know me know that I am a Marxist and a Socialist. Therefore, unlike most of my distinguished colleagues here this morning, I do not fear or regret the impending Viet Cong victory in Vietnam. I welcome it." This comment was widely reported and generated a backlash of criticism. Politicians questioned Genovese's judgment and sensitivity to the responsibility inherent in being a Rutgers professor. Richard M. Nixon, then out of office and living in New York, denounced him, and the Republican candidate for governor of New Jersey, Wayne Dumont, challenging Governor Richard J. Hughes, used Genovese's statement as a campaign issue, demanding that Hughes dismiss Genovese from the state university. Bumper stickers saying "Rid Rutgers of Reds" popped up on cars across the state. Genovese insisted that he did not mean to say that he hoped American servicemen would be killed.  No state laws or university regulations had been broken, and Genovese was supported by fellow faculty members on grounds of academic freedom. He was not dismissed from his teaching position.

Rutgers President Mason Gross refused to re-examine the university's position, and Dumont lost to Governor Hughes. President Gross' defense of academic freedom was honored by the American Association of University Professors, who presented him and Rutgers with its Alexander Meiklejohn Award in 1966. Genovese moved to Canada and taught at Sir George Williams University in Montreal (1967–69). In 1968, Genovese signed the "Writers and Editors War Tax Protest" pledge, vowing to refuse tax payments in protest against the Vietnam War.

At the 1969 convention of the American Historical Association, radical historians Staughton Lynd and Arthur Waskow, speaking on behalf of the Radical Caucus, introduced and later withdrew a resolution demanding an end to not only to the war in Vietnam but also to an “immediate end of all harassment of the Black Panther Party”. A substitute resolution introduced by the radical scholar Blanche W. Cook "deplored and condemned" the war and urged withdrawal of all American troops. It was Cook's resolution that eventually came to a vote.

During the discussion on the resolution, Genovese gave a speech, saying that although he opposed the Vietnam war, if the radicals' resolution passed, the bulk of historians in the AHA, who favored the war, would be forced to resign from the group. Noting that the majority of Americans also supported the war, Genovese said that those citizens were as moral and deserving of being heard as the war's opponents. The Radical Caucus, he said, were a bunch of "totalitarians." Genovese ended his speech by saying that the time had come for historians to isolate and defeat the New Left and "put them down, put them down hard, once and for all." When the vote was finally taken, the resolution lost, 647 to 611.

Slavery studies
In 1968, Genovese wrote a critical historiography of the major studies of slavery in the Americas from a hemispheric perspective. He considered the demand by Marxist anthropologist Marvin Harris in The Nature of Cultural Things (1964) for a materialist alternative to the idealistic framework of Frank Tannenbaum, Stanley Elkins, Gilberto Freyre, and others. Tannenbaum had first introduced the hemispheric perspective by showing that the current status of blacks in various societies of the Western Hemisphere had roots in the attitude toward the black as a slave, which reflected the total religious, legal, and moral history of the enslaving whites. Tannenbaum ignored the material foundations of slave society, most particularly class relations. Later students have qualified his perspectives but have worked within the framework of an "idealistic" interpretation. Harris, on the other hand, insisted that material conditions determined social relations and necessarily prevailed over counter-tendencies in the historical tradition. Harris' work revealed him to be an economic determinist and, as such, ahistorical. By attempting to construct a materialism that bypassed ideological and psychological elements in the formation of social classes, he passed into a "variant of vulgar Marxism" and offered only soulless mechanism.

In the 1960s, Genovese in his Marxist stage depicted the masters of the slaves as part of a "seigneurial" society that was anti-modern, pre-bourgeois and pre-capitalist. In 1970, Stampp reviewing Genovese's The World the Slaveholders Made (1969) found fault with the quantity and quality of the evidence used to support the book's arguments. He took issue with the attempt to apply a Marxian interpretation to the Southern slave system.

In his best-known book, Roll, Jordan, Roll: The World the Slaves Made (1974), Genovese examined the society of the slaves.  This book won the Bancroft Prize in 1975. Genovese viewed the antebellum South as a closed and organically united paternalist society that exploited and attempted to dehumanize the slaves. Genovese paid close attention to the role of religion as a form of resistance in the daily life of the slaves, because slaves used it to claim a sense of humanity. He redefined resistance to slavery as all efforts by which slaves rejected their status as slaves, including their religion, music, and the culture they built, as well as work slowdowns, periodic disappearances, and escapes and open rebellions.

Genovese applied Antonio Gramsci's theory of cultural hegemony to the slave South. As Dennis Dworkin expresses it, "Like [E.P.] Thompson... Genovese deployed Gramsci's ideas. For Genovese, the slaveholding society of the Old South was rooted in exploitative class relationships, but most important was the cultural hegemony of slaveholders, their paternalistic ideology establishing both the potential and limits for a semiautonomous slave culture of resistance."

Genovese placed paternalism at the center of the master-slave relationship. Both masters and slaves embraced paternalism but for different reasons and with varying notions of what paternalism meant. For the slaveowners, paternalism allowed them to think of themselves as benevolent and to justify their appropriation of their slaves' labor. Paternalist ideology, they believed, also gave the institution of slavery a more benign face and helped deflate the increasingly strong abolitionist critique of the institution. Slaves, on the other hand, recognized that paternalist ideology could be twisted to suit their own ends by providing them with improved living and working conditions. Slaves struggled mightily to convert the benevolent "gifts" or "privileges" bestowed upon them by their masters into customary rights that masters would not violate. The reciprocity of paternalism could work to the slaves' advantage by allowing them to demand more humane treatment from their masters. Religion was an important theme in Roll, Jordan, Roll and other studies. Genovese noted that Evangelicals recognized slavery as the root of Southern ills and sought some reforms, but from the early decades of the nineteenth century, they abandoned arguing for abolition or substantial change of the system.  Genovese's contention was that after 1830, southern Christianity became part of social control of the slaves. He also argued that the slaves' religion was not conducive to millenarianism or a revolutionary political tradition. Rather, it helped them survive and resist.

King (1979) argued that Genovese incorporated the theoretical concepts of certain 20th-century revisionist Marxists, especially the ideas of Antonio Gramsci and his construct of hegemony. Genovese's analysis of slavery, the blacks, and the American South elicited criticisms of various portions of his work, but historians agreed on the importance of his contributions.  Areas of criticism included Genovese's placing of the master-slave relationship at the center of his interpretation of the American South, his views on southern white guilt over slavery, his employment of Gramsci's construct of hegemony, and his interpretations of southern white class interests, slave religion, the strength of the slave family, the existence of slave culture, and the theory of the generation of black nationalism in the antebellum years.

In his 1979 book From Rebellion to Revolution, Genovese depicted a change in slave rebellions from attempts to win freedom to an effort to overthrow slavery as a social system. In the 1983 book that he co-wrote with his wife, The Fruits of Merchant Capital, Genovese underscored what he regarded as tensions between bourgeois property and slavery. In the view of the Genoveses, slavery was a "hybrid system" that was both pre-capitalist and capitalist.

Shift to the right 
Starting in the 1990s, Genovese turned his attention to the history of conservatism in the South, a tradition which he came to adopt and celebrate. In his study, The Southern Tradition: the Achievements and Limitations of an American Conservatism, he examined the Southern Agrarians. In the 1930s, these critics and poets collectively wrote I'll Take My Stand, their critique of Enlightenment humanism. He concluded that by recognizing human sinfulness and limitation, the critics more accurately described human nature than did other thinkers. He argued that the Southern Agrarians also posed a challenge to modern American conservatives who believe in market capitalism's compatibility with traditional social values and family structures. Genovese agreed with the Agrarians in concluding that capitalism destroyed those institutions. 

In his personal views, Genovese moved to the right. While he once denounced liberalism from a radical left perspective, he now did so as a traditionalist conservative. His change in thinking included abandoning atheism and re-embracing Catholicism, the faith in which he had been raised, in December 1996. His wife, historian Elizabeth Fox-Genovese, had also shifted her thinking and converted to Catholicism.

Marriage and family 
In 1969, Genovese married Elizabeth Fox (died 2007), a historian. In 2008, he published a tribute to her, Miss Betsey: A Memoir of Marriage. Genovese died in 2012, aged 82, from a "worsening cardiac ailment" in Atlanta, Georgia.

Publications 
 
 
 
 
   Winner of the Bancroft Prize in History.
  (with Elizabeth Fox-Genovese)
 
  (With Elizabeth Fox-Genovese)
 
 
 
 
  (with Elizabeth Fox-Genovese)
 
 .
 Fatal Self-Deception: Slaveholding Paternalism in the Old South, New York: Cambridge University Press, 2011 (with Elizabeth Fox-Genovese)
 The Sweetness of Life: Southern Planters at Home, New York: Cambridge University Press, 2017 (edited by Douglas Ambrose)

Notes

Bibliography 
 Baca, George. (2012). "Eugene Genovese and a Dialectical Anthropology." Dialectical Anthropology, 36:245-262. 
 .
 .
 .
 
 ; full text in Jstor.
 .
 Lichtenstein, Alex (1997). ″Right Church, Wrong Pew: Eugene Genovese & Southern Conservatism″.   New Politics, Vol. 6, No. 3 (New Series), Whole No. 23 (Summer 1997).
 .
 .
 .
 .
 .
 .
 .
 .
 .
 .

External links 
 Mark Noll on Eugene Genovese and Henry May
 
 

1930 births
2012 deaths
20th-century American historians
21st-century American historians
Activists from New York (state)
American male non-fiction writers
American Marxist historians
American tax resisters
American writers of Italian descent
Brooklyn College alumni
Catholics from New York (state)
Columbia Graduate School of Arts and Sciences alumni
Converts to Roman Catholicism from atheism or agnosticism
Former Marxists
Historians of slavery
Historians of the Southern United States
Historians of the United States
People from Brooklyn
Polytechnic Institute of New York University faculty
Rutgers University faculty
Bancroft Prize winners
Historians from New York (state)